Commonly used stock market indices include:

Global
Large companies not ordered by any nation or type of business:
 MSCI World (i.e. MSCI ACWI Index)
 S&P Global 100
 S&P Global 1200
 The Global Dow – Global version of the Dow Jones Industrial Average
 Dow Jones Global Titans 50
 FTSE All-World index series
 OTCM QX ADR 30 Index

Regional indices
 MSCI EAFE – Europe, Australasia, and Far East
 MSCI GCC – Gulf Cooperation countries)

Asia
 S&P Asia 50

Europe
 EURO STOXX 50 – 50 large blue chip companies in the Eurozone
 STOXX Europe 600
 FTSEurofirst 300 Index – the 300 largest companies ranked by market capitalisation in the FTSE Developed Europe Index.
 FTSEurofirst Euro Supersector Indices
 S&P Europe 350
 CECEEUR – Central European Clearinghouses & Exchanges Index, Composit Index in Euro. Composed of Polish Traded Index (PTX), Czech Traded Index (CTX) and Hungarian Traded Index (HTX) by the Vienna Stock Exchange.
 UBS 100 Index - the 100 Swiss companies with the largest market capitalizations that are listed on the SIX Swiss stock exchange.

Latin America
 S&P Latin America 40

National indices
Equity indices ordered by nationality of companies (in alphabetical order).

Africa

South Africa
 FTSE/JSE Top 40 Index
 FTSE/JSE All Share Index

Nigeria
 NSE All Share Index – Nigeria Stock Exchange All Share Index
 NSE 30 Index – Nigeria Stock Exchange Top 30 Index

Botswana
 BSE DCI – Botswana Stock Exchange Domestic Company Index
 BSE FCI – Botswana Stock Exchange Foreign Company Index

Zambia
 LASI – LuSE All-shares Index

Egypt
 EGX 30 Index
 EGX 50 Index
 EGX 70 Index
 EGX 100 Index

Ghana
 GSE All-Share Index

Morocco
 MASI index (Moroccan All Shares Index)
 MADEX index (Moroccan Most Active shares Index)

Zimbabwe
 Zimbabwe Industrial Index
 Zimbabwe Mining Index

Americas

Argentina
 MERVAL – 12 Companies

Brazil
 IBOVESPA – Bovespa Index

Canada
 S&P/TSX 60
 S&P/TSX Composite Index
 S&P/TSX Venture Composite Index

Chile
 IPSA

Colombia
 IGBC
 COLCAP

Jamaica
 Jamaica Stock Exchange (JSE)

Mexico
 Indice de Precios y Cotizaciones (IPC) ("Bolsa index")

Peru
 SPBLPGPT

Trinidad and Tobago
 Trinidad and Tobago Stock Exchange (TTSE)

United States
 Amex indices
 NYSE Arca Major Market Index
 CBOE indices
 CBOE DJIA BuyWrite Index (BXD)
 CBOE NASDAQ-100 BuyWrite Index (BXN)
 CBOE NASDAQ-100 Volatility Index (VXN)
 CBOE S&P 500 BuyWrite Index (BXM)
 CBOE Volatility Index (VIX)
 Dow Jones & Company indices
 Dow Jones Industrial Average
 Dow Jones Transportation Average
 Dow Jones Utility Average
 MarketGrader indices
 Barron's 400 Index
 Nasdaq indices
 NASDAQ Composite
 NASDAQ-100
 NASDAQ Financial-100
 Russell Indexes (published by Russell Investment Group)
 Russell 3000
 Russell 1000
 Russell Top 200
 Russell MidCap
 Russell 2500
 Russell Small Cap Completeness
 Standard & Poor's indices
 S&P 500 (GSPC, INX, SPX)
 S&P 100
 S&P MidCap 400
 S&P MidCap 400/BARRA Growth
 S&P MidCap 400/BARRA Value
 S&P SmallCap 600
 S&P SmallCap 600/BARRA Growth
 S&P SmallCap 600/BARRA Value
 S&P 1500
 Value Line Composite Index
 Wilshire Associates indices
 Wilshire 5000
 Wilshire 4500

Venezuela
 Índice Bursátil Caracas (IBC)

Asia

Bangladesh
 CSE 30 
 CSC X
 CASPI
 CSI 
 CSE50 
 DSEX
 DSE

China
 SSE Composite Index (上证综指)
 SZSE Component Index (深证成指)
 CSI 300 Index (沪深300指数)
 SSE 50 Index (上证50指数)
 SSE 180 Index (上证180指数)
 SZSE 100 Index (深证100指数)
 SZSE 200 Index (深证200指数)
 SZSE 300 Index (深证300指数)
 CSI 100 Index (中证100指数)

Hong Kong
 Hang Seng Index
 Hang Seng China Enterprises Index
 Hang Seng China H-Financials Index
 Hang Seng China-Affiliated Corporations Index
 MSCI Hong Kong Index

India
 BSE SENSEX
 NSE NIFTY 50
 NIFTY BANK
 S&P BSE 500
 NIFTY MIDCAP 100
 NIFTY SMALLCAP 100
 NIFTY Next 50
 NIFTY METAL
 NIFTY IT
 NIFTY 100 LOW VOLATILITY 30
 NIFTY 200
 NIFTY ALPHA 50
 NIFTY CPSE
 NIFTY ENERGY
 NIFTY FINANCE
 NIFTY FMCG
 NIFTY INDIA CONSUMPTION
 NIFTY INFRA
 NIFTY MEDIA 	 	
 NIFTY MIDCAP 50 	 	
 NIFTY MIDCAP LIQUID 15 	 	
 NIFTY MIDSMALLCAP 400 	 	
 NIFTY MNC 	 	
 NIFTY PHARMA 	
 NIFTY PSE 	 	
 NIFTY PSU BANK 	 	
 NIFTY PVT BANK 	 	
 NIFTY REALTY 	 	
 NIFTY SERV SECTOR 	 	 	
 NIFTY SMALLCAP 250 	 	
 NIFTY SMALLCAP 50 	
 NIFTY100 EQUAL WEIGHT 	 	
 NIFTY100 LIQUID 15 	 	
 NIFTY200 QUALITY 30 	
 NIFTY50 EQUAL WEIGHT

Indonesia
 IDX Composite
 LQ-45
 Jakarta Islamic Index (JII)

Iran
 TEDPIX
 TEPIX

Israel
 TA-125 Index (Tel Aviv 125)
 TA-35 Index TASE's flagship index, listing TASE's 35 largest stocks by market cap, previously called the Ma'of.
 TA-90 – Stocks on TA-125 which are not included in TA-35

Japan
 Nikkei 225
 TOPIX

Jordan
 ASE Weighted Index

Kazakhstan
 KASE

Malaysia
 Kuala Lumpur Composite Index
 MESDAQ
 FTSE Bursa Malaysia Index

Nepal
 NEPSE Index – Nepal Stock Exchange

Oman
 MSM-30

Pakistan
 KSE 100 Index
 KSE All Share Index
 KSE-30 Index
 KMI 30 Index

Philippines
 PSE Index (PSEi)
 PSE All Shares Index
 PSE Financials Index
 PSE Mining and Oil Index

Qatar
 DSM-200

Saudi Arabia
 Tadawul

Singapore
 Straits Times Index (STI)

South Korea
 KOSPI
 KOSDAQ – Small cap

Sri Lanka
 All Share Price Index (ASPI)
 Milanka Price Index (MPI) – Discontinuted with effect from January 1, 2013. 
 Colombo Stock Exchange Sector indices (CSE Sectors)

Taiwan
 Taiwan Capitalization Weighted Stock Index (TAIEX)

Thailand
 SET Index
 SET50 Index
 SET100 Index

Vietnam
 VN Index
 CBV Index
 S&P Vietnam 10 Index

Europe

Austria
 ATX

Belgium
 BEL 20

Bosnia and Herzegovina
 BIRS – main market index in Republic of Srpska
 FIRS – investment funds index in Republic of Srpska
 ERS10 – power utility index in Republic of Srpska

Bulgaria
 SOFIX

Croatia
 CROBEX
 CROBIS

Czechia
 PX Index

Denmark
 OMX Copenhagen 20 (OMXC20)

Finland
 OMX Helsinki 25 (OMXH25)

France
 CAC 40
 CAC Next 20
 CAC Large 60
 CAC Mid 60
 CAC Small
 SBF 120
 CAC Mid & Small
 CAC All-Tradable
 CAC All Share

Germany
 DAX – 40 companies weighted by the market cap
 TecDAX
 MDAX – Mid cap
 SDAX – Small cap

Greece
 Athex 20

Hungary
 BUX – Large cap
 BUMIX – Mid cap
 Central European Blue Chip Index – Regional large cap

Iceland
 OMX Iceland 15 (discontinued)
 OMX Iceland 6

Ireland
 ISEQ 20

Italy
 FTSE MIB
 FTSE Italia Mid Cap

Lithuania
 OMX Vilnius (OMXV)

Luxembourg
 LuxX Index – Luxembourg Stock Exchange

Netherlands
 AEX index
 AMX index – Mid cap
 AScX index – Small cap

Norway
 OBX Index

Poland
 WIG
 WIG30

Portugal
 PSI-20
 PSI-GERAL

Romania
 BET-10

Russia
 MICEX (Moscow Interbank Currency Exchange)
 RTS Index (RTSI)

Serbia
 BELEX15
 BELEXline

Slovakia
 Slovak Share Index

Spain
 IBEX 35
 Madrid Stock Exchange General Index

Sweden
 OMX Stockholm 30 (OMXS30)
 OMX Stockholm PI (OMXSPI)

Switzerland
 Swiss Market Index (SMI)
 SMI MID
 SMI Expanded
 Swiss Performance Index (SPI)
 Swiss Leader Index (SLI)

Ukraine
 PFTS index

United Kingdom
 FT 30 Index
 FTSE 100 Index
 FTSE MID 250 Index
 FTSE 350 Index
 FTSE All-Share Index
 FTSE SmallCap Index
 FTSE Fledgling Index
 FTSE techMark Index
 FTSE AIM All-Share Index
 FTSE AIM UK 50 Index

Oceania

Australia
 All Ordinaries
 S&P/ASX 20
 S&P/ASX 50
 S&P/ASX 200
 S&P/ASX 300

New Zealand
 S&P/NZX 50 Index

Industry indices
Stock market indices covering specific industries include (in alphabetical order):

Energy
 Amex Oil Index (companies nationality: international)

Electronics
Electronic tech, computers, hardware, software, services, Internet
 PHLX Semiconductor Sector (companies nationality: international)
 TecDax Price Index

Metals
 Amex Gold BUGS Index (companies nationality: US, Canada)
 Philadelphia Gold and Silver Index

Real Estate
 CBV Real Estate Index

Water
 Palisades Water Index (ZWI)

See also
 Capital Markets Index

Lists
 List of stock exchanges
 List of African stock exchanges
 List of American stock exchanges
 List of East Asian stock exchanges
 List of European stock exchanges
 List of South Asian stock exchanges
 List of countries by stock market capitalization

References

External links
 Major World Indices – Yahoo! Finance

Stock market indices